Evangel Christian School (ECS) is a K–12 private, Christian, co-educational school in Louisville, Kentucky, United States. It is part of the Evangel World Prayer Center.

It has a range of extracurricular activities such as athletics, academic clubs and missions trips.

References

External links 
 

Christian schools in Louisville, Kentucky
Private elementary schools in Kentucky
Private middle schools in Kentucky
Private high schools in Kentucky